The Bibelot was a yearly literary anthology published by Thomas Bird Mosher between 1895 and 1914. The Bibelot featured the lesser known works of writers such as Algernon Charles Swinburne, William Morris, Arthur Symons, D. G. Rossetti, Austin Dobson, J. A. Symonds, Robert Louis Stevenson, Oscar Wilde, and Fiona MacLeod.  In 1925 a limited edition, 21 volume "Testimonial Edition" was printed by William H. Wise & Co.

The Bibelots
There was also a series of twenty nine midget reprints of English classics (5 inches x 2¾ inches) in The Bibelots series, edited by John Potter Briscoe  and published by Gay and Bird of 22 Bedford Street, Strand, London from 1899 to 1907.  It is not known if Gay and Bird had any connection with Thomas Bird Mosher.

External links

References

Annual magazines published in the United Kingdom
Defunct literary magazines published in the United Kingdom
Magazines established in 1895
Magazines disestablished in 1914
Publishing companies of the United Kingdom